Guillermo Pérez Moreno (born 11 January 1987), commonly known as Guille, is a Spanish footballer who plays as a left midfielder for Italian club Casale.

Club career
On 24 July 2019, he signed with Serie D club Legnano.

References

External links

1987 births
Footballers from Murcia
Living people

Spanish footballers
Association football midfielders

Valencia CF Mestalla footballers
Deportivo Fabril players
Sporting de Gijón B players
Albacete Balompié players
Veria F.C. players
Panthrakikos F.C. players
PAS Lamia 1964 players
Aris Thessaloniki F.C. players
A.C. Gozzano players
Calcio Lecco 1912 players
A.C. Legnano players
A.C.D. Sant'Angelo 1907 players
Casale F.B.C. players
Segunda División B players
Segunda División players
Super League Greece players
Football League (Greece) players
Tercera División players
Serie D players
Spanish expatriate footballers
Expatriate footballers in Greece
Spanish expatriate sportspeople in Greece
Expatriate footballers in Italy
Spanish expatriate sportspeople in Italy